The 1992 Nigerian Senate election in Osun State was held on July 4, 1992, to elect members of the Nigerian Senate to represent Osun State. Olu Alabi representing Osun Central, Omilani Oladimeji representing Osun West and Segun Bamigbetan representing Osun East all won on the platform of the Social Democratic Party.

Overview

Summary

Results

Osun Central 
The election was won by Olu Alabi of the Social Democratic Party.

Osun West 
The election was won by Omilani Oladimeji of the Social Democratic Party.

Osun East 
The election was won by Segun Bamigbetan of the Social Democratic Party.

References 

Osu
Osun State Senate elections
July 1992 events in Nigeria